Matthew William Choptuik (born 1961) is a Canadian theoretical physicist specializing in numerical relativity.

Choptuik graduated from University of British Columbia with a master's degree in 1982 and a Ph.D. advised by William Unruh in 1986. He became an associate professor in 1995 at the University of Texas at Austin. In 1999 he became a member of the Institute for Theoretical Physics at the University of California, Santa Barbara and in the same year he became a professor at University of British Columbia.

In 1993, he discovered critical phenomena in gravitational collapse via numerical studies. He showed—under non-generic initial conditions —the possibility of the occurrence of naked singularity in general relativity with scalar matter. This had previously been the subject of a bet between Stephen Hawking, Kip Thorne and John Preskill. Hawking lost the bet after Choptuik's publication, but renewed it under non-generic initial conditions.

Choptuik was the 2001 awardee of the Rutherford Memorial Medal. In 2003 he received the CAP-CRM Prize in Theoretical and Mathematical Physics. In 2003 he became a fellow of the American Physical Society. In 2002, he became an honorary doctor of Brandon University.

References

External links 
Homepage

1961 births
Living people
Canadian expatriate academics in the United States
Fellows of the American Physical Society
20th-century Canadian  physicists
Theoretical physicists
21st-century Canadian physicists
University of British Columbia Faculty of Science alumni
University of Texas at Austin faculty
University of California, Santa Barbara faculty
Academic staff of the University of British Columbia